The  or Three Liberal Years was a period of three years in the modern history of Spain between 1820 and 1823, when a liberal government ruled Spain after a military uprising in January 1820 by the lieutenant-colonel Rafael de Riego against the absolutist rule of Ferdinand VII.

It ended in 1823 when, with the approval of the crowned heads of Europe, a French army invaded Spain and reinstated the King's absolute power. This invasion is known in France as the "Spanish Expedition" and in Spain as "The Hundred Thousand Sons of St. Louis".

Revolution of Cabezas de San Juan

King Ferdinand VII provoked widespread unrest, particularly in the army, by refusing to accept the liberal Spanish Constitution of 1812. The King sought to reclaim the Spanish colonies in the Americas that had recently revolted successfully, consequently depriving Spain from an important source of revenue.

In January 1820, soldiers assembled at Cádiz for an expedition to South America, angry over infrequent pay, bad food and poor quarters, mutinied under the leadership of Colonel Rafael del Riego y Nuñez. Pledging fealty to the 1812 Constitution, they seized their commander.

Subsequently, the rebel forces moved to nearby San Fernando, where they began preparations to march on the capital, Madrid.

Liberal government 

Despite the rebels' relative weakness, Ferdinand accepted the constitution on 9 March 1820, granting power to liberal ministers and ushering in the so-called Liberal Triennium (el Trienio Liberal), a period of popular rule. However, political conspiracies of both right and left proliferated in Spain, as was the case across much of the rest of Europe. Liberal revolutionaries stormed the King's palace and seized Ferdinand VII, who was a prisoner of the Cortes in all but name for the next three years and retired to Aranjuez. The elections to the Cortes Generales in 1822 were won by Rafael del Riego. Ferdinand's supporters set themselves up at Urgell, took up arms and put in place an absolutist regency, the Urgel Regency.

Ferdinand's supporters, accompanied by the Royal Guard, staged an uprising in Madrid that was subdued by forces supporting the new government and its constitution. Despite the defeat of Ferdinand's supporters at Madrid, civil war erupted in the regions of Castile, Toledo, and Andalusia.

Three years of liberal rule (the Trienio Liberal) followed. The Progresista government reorganized Spain into 52 provinces, and it intended to reduce the regional autonomy that had been a hallmark of Spanish bureaucracy since Habsburg rule in the 16th and 17th centuries. Opposition of the affected regions, in particular, Aragon, Navarre, and Catalonia, shared in the king's antipathy for the liberal government. The anticlerical policies of the Progresista government led to friction with the Roman Catholic Church, and attempts to bring about industrialisation alienated old trade guilds. The Spanish Inquisition, which had been abolished by both Joseph Bonaparte and the Cortes of Cádiz during the French occupation, was ended again by the government, which led to accusations of it being nothing more than afrancesados (francophiles), who, only six years earlier, had been forced out of the country.

More radical liberals attempted to revolt against the entire idea of a monarchy, regardless of how little power it had. In 1821, they were suppressed, but the incident served to illustrate the frail coalition that bound the government together.The election of a radical liberal government in 1823 further destabilized Spain. The army, whose liberal leanings had brought the government to power, began to waver when the Spanish economy failed to improve, and in 1823, a mutiny in Madrid had to be suppressed. The Jesuits, who had been banned by Charles III in the 18th century, only to be rehabilitated by Ferdinand VII after his restoration, were banned again by the government. For the duration of liberal rule, Ferdinand (still technically head of state) lived under virtual house arrest in Madrid. The Congress of Vienna, ending the Napoleonic Wars, had inaugurated the "Congress system" as an instrument of international stability in Europe. Rebuffed by the "Holy Alliance" of Russia, Austria, and Prussia in his request for help against the liberal revolutionaries in 1820, by 1822, the "Concert of Europe" was so concerned by Spain's liberal government and its surprising hardiness that it was prepared to intervene on Ferdinand's behalf.

In 1822, the Congress of Verona authorized France to intervene. Louis XVIII of France was only too happy to put an end to Spain's liberal experiment, and a massive army, the 100,000 Sons of Saint Louis, was dispatched across the Pyrenees in April 1823. The Spanish army, fraught by internal divisions, offered little resistance to the well organised French force, who seized Madrid and reinstalled Ferdinand as absolute monarch. The liberals' hopes for a new Spanish War of Independence were dashed.

Regarding the policy for America in the absolutist period, the new government changed political repression into negotiation. Sending troops was replaced by commissioners to attract pro-independence leaders, who were invited to submit to royal authority in exchange for recognition by Spain. With that in mind, the government announced a ceasefire for negotiations with the rebels until the 1812 Constitution, which ironically, had been superseded by Ferdinand's actions, was accepted.

According to the ceasefire, Spain would end the persecution and would issue a blanket amnesty for the insurgents; otherwise, the war would continue. The 11 commissioners failed since the patriots demanded recognition of their independence from Spain.

French intervention
In 1822, Ferdinand VII applied the terms of the Congress of Vienna, lobbied for the assistance of the other absolute monarchs of Europe, in the process joining the Holy Alliance formed by Russia, Prussia, Austria and France to restore absolutism. In France, the ultra-royalists pressured Louis XVIII to intervene. To temper their counter-revolutionary ardour, the Duc de Richelieu deployed troops along the Pyrenees Mountains along the France-Spain border, charging them with halting the spread of Spanish liberalism and the "yellow fever" from encroaching into France. In September 1822, the cordon sanitaire became an observation corps and then very quickly transformed itself into a military expedition.

The Holy Alliance (Russia, Austria and Prussia) refused Ferdinand's request for help, but the Quintuple Alliance (United Kingdom, France, Russia, Prussia and Austria), at the Congress of Verona in October 1822, gave France a mandate to intervene and restore the Spanish monarchy.  On 22 January 1823, a secret treaty was signed at the congress of Verona, allowing France to invade Spain to restore Ferdinand VII as an absolute monarch. With that agreement from the Holy Alliance, on 28 January 1823, Louis XVIII announced that "a hundred thousand Frenchmen are ready to march, invoking the name of Saint Louis, to safeguard the throne of Spain for a grandson of Henry IV of France".

Bibliography

In French
Encyclopédie Universalis, Paris, Volume 18, 2000
Larousse, tome 1, 2, 3, Paris, 1998
Caron, Jean-Claude, La France de 1815 à 1848, Paris, Armand Colin, coll. « Cursus », 2004, 193 p.
Corvisier, André, Histoire militaire de la France, de 1715 à 1871, tome 2, Paris, Presses universitaires de France, "Quadrige" collection, 1998, 627 p.
Demier, Francis, La France du XIXe 1814–1914, Seuil, 2000, 606 p.
Dulphy, Anne, Histoire de l'Espagne de 1814 à nos jours, le défi de la modernisation, Paris, Armand Colin, "128" collection, 2005, 127 p.
Duroselle, Jean-Baptiste, L'Europe de 1815 à nos jours : vie politique et relation internationale, Paris, Presses Universitaires de France, "Nouvelle clio" collection, 1967, 363 p.
Garrigues, Jean, Lacombrade, Philippe, La France au 19e siècle, 1814–1914, Paris, Armand Colin, "Campus" collection, 2004, 191 p.
Lever, Evelyne, Louis XVIII, Paris, Fayard, 1998, 597 p.
Jean Sarrailh, Un homme d'état espagnol: Martínez de la Rosa (1787–1862) (Paris, 1930)

In Spanish
 Miguel Artola Gallego, La España de Fernando VII (Madrid, 1968)
 Jonathan Harris, 'Los escritos de codificación de Jeremy Bentham y su recepción en el primer liberalismo español', Télos. Revista Iberoamericana de Estudios Utilitaristas 8 (1999), 9–29
W. Ramírez de Villa-Urrutia, Fernando VII, rey constitucional. Historia diplomática de España de 1820 a 1823 (Madrid, 1922)

In English
Raymond Carr, Spain 1808–1975 (Oxford, 1982, 2nd ed.)
 Charles W. Fehrenbach, ‘Moderados and Exaltados: the liberal opposition to Ferdinand VII, 1814–1823’, Hispanic American Historical Review 50 (1970), 52–69
 Jonathan Harris, 'An English utilitarian looks at Spanish American independence: Jeremy Bentham's Rid Yourselves of Ultramaria', The Americas 53 (1996), 217–33

References

External links
http://www.onwar.com/aced/data/sierra/spain1820.htm
http://www.thefreedictionary.com/Spanish+Civil+War

1820s in Spain
Bourbon Restoration
19th-century revolutions
Revolutions during the 1820s

fr:Restauration absolutiste en Espagne#Triennat libéral (1820-1823)